The Adversary is a fictional character, a demonic supervillain appearing in American comic books published by Marvel Comics.

Publication history
The Adversary first appeared in Uncanny X-Men #187-188 (November-December 1984), and was created by Chris Claremont and John Romita Jr.

Fictional character biography
The Adversary is a demon who was initially summoned by the X-Men member Forge several decades ago and has since come back to antagonize the X-Men and threaten the entire world.

During the Vietnam War, Forge saw his company slain by the North Vietnamese. Forge tapped into his long-suppressed shamanic heritage to summon the Adversary to destroy the attackers, but then regained his senses and banished the demon. Nevertheless, the Adversary had a foothold on the Earth thanks to Forge's actions.

Years later, Forge's mentor Nazé was killed and his form and memories stolen by a Dire Wraith, an alien parasite. The Nazé impostor summoned the Adversary, only to be destroyed by the demon. The Adversary was then able to escape the dimension to which he was bound, capturing Forge and his ally, Storm of the X-Men, and imprisoning them in the otherworldly stronghold of the goddess Roma, whom he subdued.

The Adversary then travelled to Dallas, Texas and battled the combined forces of the X-Men and Freedom Force during the "Fall of the Mutants" crossover. Ultimately, the only way to permanently banish the Adversary was for nine souls to willingly sacrifice themselves in a magical spell. The X-Men agreed, and Forge cast the spell. The X-Men died, but Roma secretly returned them to life.

The Adversary later returned to Earth, having been physically born, but was again banished by Forge, who was at the time affiliated with X-Factor.

During the Fear Itself storyline, Adversary attends the Devil's Advocacy to talk about the Serpent's actions on Earth.

The Adversary possesses Forge in Cable and X-Force - Volume 4, but is trapped in a mind prison inside Dr. Nemesis' subconsciousness.

Powers and abilities
The Adversary is a powerful demon of the highest order and possesses vast supernatural powers. He is virtually invulnerable to anything but the most powerful magic and iron. He has superhuman strength and endurance. 

He can enter and leave different planes of existence and dimensions at will and has reality-warping powers. He can also summon demons and other supernatural creatures to do his bidding.

References

External links
 Adversary at Marvel.com
 Adversary at Marvel Wiki
 Adversary at Comic Vine

Comics characters introduced in 1984
Marvel Comics characters with superhuman strength
Marvel Comics demons
Marvel Comics male supervillains
Characters created by Chris Claremont
Characters created by John Romita Jr.

it:Avversario